Trecothick was launched on the Thames in 1773, possibly under another name. She first appeared as Trecothick in 1784 and was lost in 1786.

Trecothick entered Lloyd's Register (LR) in 1784.

On 4 January 1786, Trecothick was lost near Looe, Cornwall with the loss of all but four of her crew. She was on a voyage from London to Grenada. Another report stated that Captain Elder and 12 of his crew had drowned when a violent gale had driven Trecothick on a ridge of rocks. Lloyd's Register for 1786 carried the annotation "Lost" by her name.

Citations

1773 ships
Age of Sail merchant ships of England
Maritime incidents in 1786